Hey Monie! is an American animated sitcom produced by Soup2Nuts. It features heavily improvised dialogue by the Second City cast, similarly to Soup2Nuts animated sitcom Home Movies.

Its creator and executive producer was Dorothea Gillim, creator of WordGirl, who also produced animated series Curious George, Pinkalicious & Peterrific, Molly of Denali, and Time Warp Trio.

The show began as 5-minute shorts that were part of Oxygen Network's animation series X-Chromosome. It achieved 11-minute episodes Hey Monie! aired on BET and, afterward, on the Oxygen in 2003. It was BET's first animated series; BET stated that it followed "the tradition of entertaining and satirical animated programming like The Simpsons, The Critic, and Daria."

In 2003, Seattle PI described the series as "smart, and at times wickedly funny."

It is one of the only adult animated series to feature a Black woman as its protagonist.

Plot
Simone a.k.a. "Monie" (Angela V. Shelton), is a publicist at a PR agency in Chicago. She lives in an apartment building with her best friend, Yvette (Frances Callier). The show chronicles her life living as a single career woman in the big city.

Cast
The series protagonists are voiced by the improv comedy Frangela duo, who are real-life best friends.

 Angela V. Shelton as Monie
 Frances Callier as Yvette
 Melissa Bardin Galsky as Robin
 Dean Edwards
 Sam Seder
 H. Jon Benjamin as a self-defense instructor
 Oprah Winfrey as herself

Legacy 
Hey Monie! was not released on DVD; this may explain its multiple half-hour lost episodes. This also may explain why Hey Monie! did not amass a fandom as numerous as that of Home Movies; creator Brendon Small has attributed Home Movies' DVD release "for its increased popularity and cult following."

A 2004 SFGate article lamented the previous year's cancellation of Hey Monie!, as the show positively impacted diversity on television. That year, the show was recommended in self-help book Beautylicious!

In 2006, television scholar Amanda D. Lotz praised the show's cast for bringing "an authentic feel to the show's language and dialogue."

In 2016, Bustle described the show as a feminist cartoon "way before its time and gone way too soon." That year, the show was listed in Vibe's "Forgotten Laughs: 9 Black Shows You Missed Out On."

In 2018, Flood Magazine interviewed show creators and stars about the show, although series creator Gillim "was astonished that she was contacted for an interview for this piece, based on how little updated information about the show is available online." Once it was cancelled, Shelton and Callier stated "the show's momentum halted when executives got involved, hiring a white writer—without consulting either of them—to pen the final episodes." These episodes are now lost due to a lack of DVD release.

In 2019, Tuca & Bertie creator Lisa Hanawalt mentioned the show while compiling a list of adult animated shows created by women.

See also 

 Insecure, a comparable 2016 TV series with an African-American woman as its protagonist
 O'Grady, a teen-oriented animated sitcom also by Soup2Nutz

References

External links
 

2003 American television series debuts
2003 American television series endings
2000s American adult animated television series
2000s American black cartoons
2000s American black sitcoms
American adult animated comedy television series
American animated sitcoms
American flash adult animated television series
English-language television shows
BET original programming
Oxygen (TV channel) original programming
Television series by Soup2Nuts
Television shows set in Chicago